Dacia (in the Transylvanian Saxon dialect, Ste, Stin, Štîn, in German Stein, in Hungarian Garat), is a village in Brașov County, Romania, part of Jibert commune. Until 1931, the village was known in Romanian as Ștena (Romanianization of the German/Saxon name). In that year, the authorities changed its name to Dacia.

History
The village was first attested in 1309. Until 1980, it was inhabited by a majority of Transylvanian Saxons (by the end of 1970, most of them started emigrating in Germany). The Transylvanian Saxon noble family of Soterius von Sachsenheim has its origins in this village, Valentinus Schöchtert (born c. 1554) being the earliest known ancestor.

Climate
Dacia has a humid continental climate (Cfb in the Köppen climate classification).

<div style="width:70%;">

Churches
The Lutheran fortified church dates from the 12th century.

Education

The German school was first mentioned in the year 1488.

Image gallery

References

Populated places in Brașov County
Populated places established in the 14th century